Dietmar Hirsch (born 8 December 1971) is a German football manager and a former player.

Coaching career
From June 2008 to December 2009 Hirsch worked as athletic director at VfB Lübeck.

From 2013 to 2014 he managed SV Elversberg.

On 22 September 2015, he was named new manager of VfB Oldenburg.

Honours
 DFB-Pokal winner: 1994–95
 DFB-Pokal finalist: 1997–98

References

External links
 
 

1971 births
Living people
People from Viersen
Sportspeople from Düsseldorf (region)
German footballers
Footballers from North Rhine-Westphalia
Association football midfielders
Bundesliga players
2. Bundesliga players
Borussia Mönchengladbach players
MSV Duisburg players
SpVgg Unterhaching players
FC Hansa Rostock players
VfB Lübeck players
German football managers
3. Liga managers
SV Elversberg managers
VfB Oldenburg managers
KSV Hessen Kassel managers
West German footballers